Andries Vermeulen (1763 - 1814) was a Dutch painter.

Vermeulen was born in Dordrecht. He was taught by his father, Cornelis Vermeulen. He was primarily a landscape painter. He worked for some time in Amsterdam, where he died. He is known for landscapes and engravings and his pupils were Leendert de Koningh and Arnoldus van Well.

References

1763 births
1814 deaths
18th-century Dutch painters
18th-century Dutch male artists
Dutch male painters
Dutch landscape painters
Artists from Dordrecht